Basshunter is a Swedish singer, record producer and DJ. He has recorded five studio albums and two compilation albums (over 90 songs). His first album, The Bassmachine, was released on 25 August 2004 online. In 2006 he signed with Extensive Music and Warner Music Sweden. His album, The Old Shit, and The Bassmachine were released on his website in 2006. Basshunter's debut studio album, LOL, was released on 28 August 2006. This was followed by the singles "Vi sitter i Ventrilo och spelar DotA" and "Vifta med händerna", where Basshunter collaborated with Patrik & Lillen. He then worked with PJ Harmony, producing "Utan stjärnorna", "Var är jag" and "Festfolk [2006 Remix]".

In 2007, Basshunter collaborated with DJ Mental Theo's Bazzheadz on "Now You're Gone". In 2008 he released a cover version of "Please Don't Go" and "All I Ever Wanted", followed by his second studio album (Now You're Gone) on 14 July. Basshunter worked with Scott Simons and Robert Uhlmann, who produced most of the songs on Now You're Gone. Simons also wrote "Dream Girl" and "In Her Eyes". The album's deluxe edition contained a bonus single, "Walk on Water", and was released in 2009. Francis Hill co-wrote "Bass Creator" and "Camilla". A cover for "Angel in the Night", and "I Miss You" were later released.

Basshunter again worked with Simons on "Every Morning" and "I Promised Myself", the first single from Bass Generation (released on 28 September 2009). He continued working with Hill (who wrote "I Still Love") and Uhlmann, who produced "Plane to Spain" and "Day & Night". Hill and Simons co-wrote "Can You". Simons also co-wrote "I Can't Deny" and "Numbers"; he and Basshunter wrote and produced "On Our Side". The Early Bedroom Sessions was a compilation album which was released on 3 December 2012. The album consisted of seven songs from two previous Basshunter albums, The Old Shit, and all 10 songs from The Bassmachine. "Go Down Now" was a single, and "Angel in the Night" was released as a promotional single. Other songs include "Wacco Will Kick Your Ass" and four unreleased songs.

"Saturday" was produced by Cutfather and Thomas Troelsen. Basshunter collaborated on the single, "Fest i hela huset", with participants in the Swedish Big Brother series. "Northern Light", a later single, was co-written by Basshunter with Minna Benne Elo and Marcus Wickström. "Dream on the Dancefloor" was co-written with Scott Simons and Eric Turner. Basshunter and Simons produced the song. His fourth studio album, Calling Time, was released on 13 May 2013. Basshunter collaborated with singers Dulce María and Sandra Gee. María co-wrote and co-produced "Wake Up Beside Me", and Gee wrote "Dirty". "Crash & Burn" was co-written by Adam Baptiste, who co-wrote "I Came Here to Party" with Basshunter and Najah. "You're Not Alone" was written by Basshunter and Maja. "Calling Time", co-written and co-produced by Simons, was released as a single. His latest single "Life Speaks to Me" was written by himself, Mohombi, Lucky Luke and Alexandru Cotoi.

Released songs

Unreleased songs

Gallery

Notes

References

External links
 

Basshunter